Platner may refer to:

Places
 Platner, Colorado

People
 Ernst Platner (1744–1818), German anthropologist, physician, and philosopher
 Ernst Zacharias Platner (1773–1855), German painter and writer, son of the foregoing
 Samuel Ball Platner (1863–1921), U.S. classicist and archaeologist
 Warren Platner (1919–2006), U.S. architect and interior designer

See also
 Plattner